This is a list of bus stations in Scotland.

List

See also 

 List of bus stations in London
 List of bus stations in Wales

References 

Scotland